Relva is a settlement in the eastern part of the island of Fogo, Cape Verde. It is situated near the coast, 7 km southeast of Mosteiros and 23 km northeast of the island capital São Filipe.

See also
List of villages and settlements in Cape Verde

References

Villages and settlements in Fogo, Cape Verde
Mosteiros, Cape Verde